Lonely Christmas may refer to:

Lonely Christmas (EP) by Sloppy Seconds, 1992
"Lonely Christmas" (Crayon Pop song), 2013
Lonely Christmas (Bryson Tiller song), 2021